Kosrae International Airport  is an airport serving Kosrae, the easternmost state of the Federated States of Micronesia. It is located on an artificial island within the fringing reef about 150 meters from the coast and is connected to the main island by a causeway.

The airport has been continuously served by the United Airlines (formerly Continental Micronesia) Island Hopper service between Guam and Honolulu, which stops twice weekly at Kosrae in each direction. Kosrae is three jogs from both Guam and Honolulu. As of June 2015, Nauru Airlines stops at Kosrae once a week in each direction between Nauru and Chuuk.

Airlines and destinations

See also

 Island Hopper scheduled air service

References

External links 
Kosrae Visitors Center: Jewel of Micronesia
AirNav.com: FAA information for PTSA
CrusingAltitude.com's photo essay of KSA
 Photos of Kosrae

Airports in the Federated States of Micronesia
Airport
International airports in the Federated States of Micronesia